Mai Chao (born on March 9, 1964, in Guangzhou, Guangdong) is a Chinese football coach and a former international football player. He spent his whole playing career for Guangzhou Apollo as an attacking left-back. After retiring, he moved into management, where he went on to manage Guangzhou twice as well as Shenzhen Xiangxue Eisiti.

Playing career
Mai Chao spent his whole playing career with Guangzhou Apollo as an attacking left-back and saw the team rise through the Chinese pyramid before being called up to the Chinese national team where he would make his debut appearance against Italy in friendly on May 11, 1986, in a 2–0 defeat. He would become a regular within the team and score his debut goal against Indonesia on August 25, 1986, in a 3–0 win before being called up to the Football at the 1986 Asian Games and then the 1988 AFC Asian Cup. Unfortunately he was part of the squad that narrowly missed out of reaching the FIFA World Cup after losing the final group game to Qatar in the dying minutes during qualification. Mai, however would end his international career as the countries top goalscoring defender while also seeing Guangzhou move into full professionalism before he retired.

International goals

Management career
After retiring Mai would move into training and due to high regard within Guangzhou Apollo he would rejoin them in 1997 as their new manager. His time as manager was not successful and he was gone by the end of the 1998 league season, which also saw the club relegated after they finished bottom of the league. Out of management he would go on to form a youth football school before Guangzhou once again asked for his services. This time he was asked to achieve promotion back into the top tier, however while his second reign was considerably more successful he was unlucky in achieving this goal in his first attempt when he narrowly missed out on promotion through head-to-head results with Henan Construction in the 2003 league season. Despite coming close through the next two seasons Guangzhou decided to allow Mai to leave, however he wouldn't have to wait long before he took a position at Shenzhen Xiangxue Eisiti on January, 2007 where he would later become their head coach on December 14 of the same year during the off season where during this period he took on the training sessions and lead the team out at the beginning of the 2008 Chinese Super League before his contracted finished and he left the club.

Honours

Player

Guangzhou Apollo
Chinese Jia-A League: 1992, 1994 (Runners-up)
Chinese FA Cup: 1991 (Runners-up)

References

External links
 

1964 births
Living people
Chinese footballers
Footballers from Guangzhou
Chinese football managers
Guangzhou F.C. players
Footballers at the 1988 Summer Olympics
1988 AFC Asian Cup players
Olympic footballers of China
China international footballers
Guangzhou F.C. managers
Footballers at the 1986 Asian Games
Shenzhen F.C. managers
Footballers at the 1990 Asian Games
Association football defenders
Asian Games competitors for China